Katsura Ko-ryū (桂古流) is a Japanese school of ikebana.

The name means "old school from Katsura", a location near Kyoto.

References

External links 

 Official homepage

Kadō schools